Basirpur railway station is located in Pakistan.

See also
 List of railway stations in Pakistan
 Pakistan Railways

References

External links

Railway stations in Okara District
Railway stations on Lodhran–Raiwind Line